South Chungcheong Province (Chungcheongnam-do) is divided into 8 cities (si) and 7 counties (gun).  The city and county names below are given in English, hangul, and hanja.

Cities

Counties

List by Population and Area

General information

See also
Chungcheongnam-do

Chungcheong, South
Chungcheong, South